Oaks Park High School can refer to either of the following:

Oaks Park High School, Carshalton
Oaks Park High School, Ilford

See also
Oak Park High School (disambiguation)